This is a list of regions of Cameroon by Human Development Index as of 2023 with data for the year 2021.

References 

Regions of Cameroon
Cameroon
Economy of Cameroon